Art James (born Arthur Simeonovich Efimchick; October 15, 1929 – March 28, 2004) was an American game-show host, best known for shows such as The Who, What, or Where Game, It's Academic. and Pay Cards! He was also the announcer and substitute host on the game show Concentration.

Biography
James was born in Dearborn, Michigan, to Russian immigrants (fluent in Russian, he taught English to Russian immigrants). He attended Wayne State University in nearby Detroit, where he studied engineering. He worked as an announcer for the Armed Forces Network while stationed in Germany after World War II.

An old Army friend, who was an executive with NBC, asked James to audition for a new game show, Concentration, hosted by Hugh Downs, which needed an announcer. Concentration ran from 1958–73, and was NBC's longest-running game show. He went on to either announce or host over a dozen game shows, including Say When!!,  It's Academic, The Who, What, or Where Game, Pay Cards!, Temptation, The Joker's Wild, Blank Check, The Magnificent Marble Machine, Concentration, Catchphrase, and Tic-Tac-Dough. He made an appearance in Kevin Smith's movie Mallrats.

He started Art James Productions in 1975 with his business partner and producer, Dan Cross. Their joint company staged game shows that were specially created to communicate marketing and corporate strategies to key stakeholders of Fortune 500 companies.

One episode of Say When! included a classic blooper by James while doing a live in-show commercial for Peter Pan peanut butter; during the sales pitch, he dropped a knife into the near-empty glass jar, breaking out the bottom and causing the knife to fall through. Though he struggled to keep from laughing, and because a retake was impossible, James still finished the commercial. The gaffe has been shown on many blooper specials.

Later years and death
James was a frequent contributor to TV Guide, writing about the world of game shows. He was living in Chaska, Minnesota, at the end of his life, and died of unspecified natural causes during a visit to his brother in Palm Springs, California. He was survived by his two children and three grandchildren.

References

External links

1929 births
2004 deaths
Game show announcers
American game show hosts
Wayne State University alumni
American people of Russian descent
Fordson High School alumni
Television personalities from New Rochelle, New York
Television personalities from Detroit